Vladimir Horunzhy (born September 19, 1949, in Kyiv) is a film producer and composer, a well-known jazz musician. 
Graduated from a Special music school at Kyiv Music Conservatory.
His first composition was written at the age of 12.
In the '70s led the Pop-Symphony Orchestra of Radio and Television of Ukraine. 
From 1977 to 1981 lived and worked in Hungary. 
Moved to the U.S. in 1981. 
The first project, which he participated in as a composer there, was the famous daytime soap opera “Santa Barbara”.

An active jazz musician, Vladimir performed at Soviet jazz festivals in Tallinn, Moscow, Donetsk, and throughout the Soviet Union. At age 26 he became principal conductor and staff composer for the Ukrainian National TV and Radio Orchestra, Kyiv. Living in Budapest, Vladimir composed and conducted for Hungarian State Orchestra. Entering the realm of film scoring, he scored feature films and animation. He also performed with jazz-rock groups throughout the European community.

Later on, when Vladimir moved to New York, he had an opportunity to work with such renowned musicians as George Benson, Michael Brecker, Marcus Miller, and Michael Urbaniak, to name just a few. 
He frequented jazz club "Seventh Avenue South" with his groups "212" and "Central Committee" that included Omar Hakim, Victor Bailey, Bob Malach, Jeff Andrews, Don Mulvaney, Mitch Coodley, and others.

In the course of his work, Vladimir met film composing-great, Jerry Goldsmith. Orchestrating for and studying with the Master, Vladimir further refined his art of film scoring.

Starting in 1991 Vladimir Horunzhy produced his first feature. 
Comedy "High Strung" had an all-star cast and became an instant hit with fans of Jim Carrey, Steve Oedekerk, Fred Willard, and Kirsten Dunst (her first part in the movies). This film became a cult classic.
There are more than 60 features, TV and animation films produced and/or scored by Vladimir Horunzhy.
Since 2006 along with a US-based production company, producing Ukrainian film projects. 
In 2009 he founded the production company/studio InQ located in Kyiv, Ukraine.

Filmography

Producer 
 2013 - Synevir 3D (www.synevirthemovie.com)  Gran Prix at Moscow International 3D Film Festival
 2012 - Lovers in Kyiv (www.loversinkiev.com)  winner of more than 20 International Film Festivals
 2010 – My Widow’s Husband
 2009 - 13 months
 2007 - Orangelove
 1999 – Mike, Lu & Og
 1999 – Flying Nansen
 1999 – Turnaround
 1996 – Lord Protector/ Dark Mist
 1996 – Original Gangstas
 1995 - Sacred Cargo
 1991 – High Strung

Composer 
 2002 - Bookashky  winner of more than 40 Grand Prizes at International Film Festivals
 1999 – Children of the Corn 666
 1999 – Mike, Lu & Og
 1999 - Flying Nansen
 1999 - Turnaround
 1996 – Lord Protector/ Dark Mist
 1996 - Original Gangstas
 1995 – Sacred Cargo
 1995 – Blood of the innocent
 1995 – The Langoliers
 1993 - Point of Impact
 1992 - Miracle in the Wilderness
 1992 - Blink of an Eye
 1991 - High Strung
 1991 - Firehead
 1990 – Stranger Within
 1990 - The Forbidden Dance
 1990 - Zorro
 1989 – Elves
 1989 - Homer and Eddie
 1989 - Oro fino
 1989 - Tales from the Crypt
 1989 - Man of passion / Pasión de hombre
 1988 - Return of the Living Dead Part II
 1989 - Creepy Tales
 1975 - Four inseparable cockroach and the cricket

External links 
 
 
 Vladimir Horunzhy on television.aol.com
 Vladimir Horunzhy on tv.com
 Vladimir's Ukrainian movie Orange Love

American film producers
Living people
American film score composers
1949 births
Ukrainian composers